MV PFC William B. Baugh (AK-3001) was one of the Strategic sealift ships of the U.S. Military Sealift Command.  It was named after Private First Class William B. Baugh, a U.S. Marine who was awarded a Medal of Honor in the Korea War for sacrificing his life to save his comrades.  The ship was of the class known as the Corporal Louis J. Hauge Jr. class and was part of a prepositioning program of the U.S. Navy that deployed supply ships in key areas prior to actual need. The ship was 755 feet long and had a top speed of 17.5 knots. It was removed from service in 2008.

Citations

External links
Specifications of the ship on NavySite.de
U.S. Navy webpage on strategic sealift and prepositioning ships

Cpl. Louis J. Hauge Jr.-class cargo ship
1979 ships
Ships built in Denmark
Gulf War ships of the United States
Merchant ships of the United States
Cargo ships of the United States Navy
Container ships of the United States Navy